Jamurki Union is a union of Mirzapur Upazila, Tangail District, Bangladesh.

Demographics
According to the 2011 Bangladesh census, Jamurki Union had 7,810 households and a population of 33,493. The literacy rate (age 7 and over) was 57.7% (male: 60%, female: 55.5%).

See also
 Union Councils of Tangail District

References

Populated places in Tangail District
Unions of Mirzapur Upazila